Adrian Grant Dugmore (born 1 February 1967) is a South Africa-born Argentine cricketer and cricket administrator based in Argentina. Dugmore played as a right-handed batsman and a wicket-keeper.

Dugmore was born at Grahamstown, Cape Province in 1967 and began his senior cricketing career in the 1990/91 South African season, playing for Eastern Province County Districts in the Nissan Shield. He made only two official List A cricket appearances for the side.

After playing in Scotland in the mid-1990s, Dugmore played for Argentina between 2002 and 2012.

Dugmore also refereed all three matches during the Central American Championship competition of 2006, in which Belize were victorious over Mexico and Costa Rica.

References

1967 births
Argentine cricketers
Living people
South African cricketers
South African emigrants to Argentina
South African cricket coaches
People from Makhanda, Eastern Cape
Cricket match referees
Wicket-keepers
Cricketers from the Eastern Cape